The flat-necked shieldback (Arytropteris basalis) is a species of shield-backed katydid that is endemic to the coastal forests and thickets of KwaZulu-Natal province in South Africa. It is threatened by cultivation, mining and tourism.

References

Tettigoniinae
Vulnerable animals
Endemic insects of South Africa
Insects described in 1869